Ruslan Magomedovich Maltsev (born 24 February 2003) is a Russian football player. He plays for FC Saturn Ramenskoye.

Club career
He made his debut in the Russian Football National League for FC Veles Moscow on 15 September 2021 in a game against FC Olimp-Dolgoprudny.

References

External links
 
 
 Profile by Russian Football National League

2003 births
Living people
Russian footballers
Association football midfielders
FC Dynamo Moscow reserves players
FC Veles Moscow players
FC Saturn Ramenskoye players
Russian First League players